Roy Harlie Edwards (May 27, 1954November 2, 2020) was an American politician from Wyoming.

Early life
Edwards was born in Gillette, Wyoming, on May 27, 1954. He graduated from Campbell County High School in 1972.

Career
Edwards was the owner of the Edwards Title Company LLC. He served on the Gillette City Council for 12 years and on the Campbell County Board of Commissioners for 8 years. On November 4, 2014, Edwards was elected to the Wyoming House of Representatives where he represented the 53rd district as a Republican. He assumed office on January 5, 2015.

Political Positions
He was considered politically conservative. The American Conservative Union's Center for Legislative Accountability gives him a lifetime rating of 84.14.

Personal life
Edwards was an Independent Baptist. He was married to his wife, Glenda, and had three children and five grandchildren.

Edwards died in office from complications of COVID-19 in Casper, Wyoming, on November 2, 2020, at age 66, during the COVID-19 pandemic in Wyoming. His death occurred the day before the general election that year, in which he was running unopposed.

References

1954 births
2020 deaths
21st-century American politicians
Baptists from Wyoming
County commissioners in Wyoming
Deaths from the COVID-19 pandemic in Wyoming
Republican Party members of the Wyoming House of Representatives
People from Gillette, Wyoming
Businesspeople from Wyoming
Politicians elected posthumously
Wyoming city council members